Michael Louwrens is a paralympic athlete from South Africa competing mainly in category F57 shot put and discus events.

Michael won three Paralympic gold medals in the shot put winning in 1996, 2000 and 2004.  At each of these games he also competed in the discus but was unable to win a medal in the discus.  His fourth and final games came in 2008 but could only finish fifth in the shot put, the first time in the Paralympics that he had not won the gold medal.

References

Paralympic athletes of South Africa
Athletes (track and field) at the 1996 Summer Paralympics
Athletes (track and field) at the 2000 Summer Paralympics
Athletes (track and field) at the 2004 Summer Paralympics
Athletes (track and field) at the 2008 Summer Paralympics
Paralympic gold medalists for South Africa
Living people
Paralympic bronze medalists for South Africa
Medalists at the 1996 Summer Paralympics
Medalists at the 2000 Summer Paralympics
Medalists at the 2004 Summer Paralympics
Medalists at the 2012 Summer Paralympics
African Games gold medalists for South Africa
African Games medalists in athletics (track and field)
Year of birth missing (living people)
Athletes (track and field) at the 2011 All-Africa Games
Paralympic medalists in athletics (track and field)
South African male shot putters
Wheelchair shot putters
Paralympic shot putters